Ireland participated at the 2015 Summer Universiade, in Gwangju, South Korea.

Competitors

Medals by sport

Medalists

External links
 Country Overview Ireland

Nations at the 2015 Summer Universiade
2015 in Irish sport